Logan McMenamie was the 13th Bishop of British Columbia in the Anglican Church of Canada. He was elected on December 7, 2013, and was consecrated and enthroned on March 2, 2014. McMenamie previously served as Dean of Columbia and Rector of Christ Church Cathedral, Victoria, from 2006 to 2014 and as Archdeacon of Juan de Fuca from 1997 to 2006.

References 

21st-century Anglican Church of Canada bishops
Anglican bishops of British Columbia
Living people
Scottish emigrants to Canada
Year of birth missing (living people)